Clockwise is a direction that moves with the clock's dials. This may also refer to:

 Clockwise, a puzzle game for the Amiga CD32 games console
 Clockwise (band), a Swedish music project
 Clockwise (film) (1986), starring John Cleese